Li Dongyang (1447–1516) was a Chinese historian, poet, and politician during the Ming dynasty.

Born in Beijing, it is said Li began writing since 4 years old. He was invited by the Jingtai Emperor to the court for testing and requested his presence twice for his own interpretation on Shangshu and was delighted by his response. In 1464, Li Dongyang ranked second in the court exam and entered the Hanlin Academy afterwards. From 1465 to 1467, he was included in the project of compiling Veritable Records of the Jingtai Reign (Yingzong shilu).

In 1505, Li Dongyang, Liu Jian and Xie Qian were entrusted to lead a transitional cabinet and support the crowned prince, by the testate emperor. On the day Liu Jin was vested with significant power, they tendered resignations against this .

He served as an official under four emperors for over 50 years in roles including "Grand Historian" and "Minister of Rites" and Senior Grand Secretary in Ming civil government. He also wrote poetry and was commissioned to compile the Collected Statutes of the Ming Dynasty.

References

External links 
 Li Dongyang ("Renditions" magazine)

1447 births
1516 deaths
15th-century Chinese historians
Historians from Beijing
Ming dynasty historians
Ming dynasty poets
Senior Grand Secretaries of the Ming dynasty
Politicians from Beijing
Poets from Beijing